Josh Anderson may refer to:

Josh Anderson (Neighbours), character who appeared on the soap opera Neighbours
Josh Anderson (baseball) (born 1982), Major League Baseball outfielder 
Josh Anderson (ice hockey) (born 1994), National Hockey League forward
Josh Anderson (serial killer) (born 1987), American serial killer